The Raytheon Coyote is a small, expendable, unmanned aircraft system built by the Raytheon Company, with the capability of operating in autonomous swarms. It is launched from a sonobuoy canister with the wings deploying in early flight phase. 

The system can operate up to one hour and is designed for interchangeable payloads. It is used by the National Oceanic and Atmospheric Administration (NOAA) for hurricane tracking, and is being assessed by the United States Air Force and Army as an intelligence, surveillance, and reconnaissance asset, as well as for delivering kinetic payloads.

Design and development
A company named Advanced Ceramic Research of Tucson, Arizona, originally developed the Coyote, Manta and Silver Fox UAS under small business contracts from the U.S. Office of Naval Research. British defense contractor BAE Systems acquired the company in 2009, then sold it back to one of the former owners under the name Sensintel. Raytheon acquired Sensintel in 2015 and folded the company into its Tucson-based Raytheon Missiles & Defense business.

The Coyote first flew in 2007 while still under ACR development, being launched from a Beechcraft C-12 Huron.

C-UAS
The U.S. Army developed the Coyote with a counter unmanned air system (C-UAS) capability to intercept other small UAVs. It weighs  and delivers a kinetic effect by crashing into enemy drones or exploding near them and dispersing blast fragments from its  warhead. By 2018, the U.S. Marine Corps was deploying a C-UAS that had been in development for two years. The Ground-Based Air Defense (GBAD) Counter-UAS system consists of the RPS-42 S-band radar, the Modi electronic warfare system, visual sensors and the Coyote anti-drone UAV to detect, track and destroy hostile drones. The system can operate out of a forward operating base or from vehicles such as an M-ATV or a pair of MRZR off-road vehicles. In July 2018, Raytheon announced the Army had awarded it a contract to deliver the Coyote for C-UAS missions, with deliveries starting by the end of the year. In June 2019, the Coyote-KRFS radar system, dubbed Howler C-UAS, achieved Initial Operational Capability with the U.S. Army after just 17 months of development.

Raytheon then developed a Block 2 variant equipped with a jet engine, improving speed and loiter time to engage larger and further targets. On 17 March 2020, Raytheon was cleared to sell the Coyote Block 2 interceptor as part of the Howler system after entering U.S. military service. Leveraging commercial off-the-shelf components, the interceptor is cheap enough to be used against large drone swarms. Four control fins pop out around the tail to make it maneuverable enough to close in on evading targets. It is fitted with a warhead producing a fragment field of small, fast-moving shrapnel optimized to destroy small drones.

In November 2022, the U.S. approved the sale of 10 Fixed Site-Low, Slow, Small UAV Integrated Defeat Systems (FS-LIDS) to Qatar in a $1 billion deal. A system includes the AN/TPQ-50 radar and electro-optic cameras to detect and track small UAVs and engages them with EW or interceptors; the sale includes 200 Coyote Block 2s.

Block 3
On 28 February 2021, Raytheon received a contract from the U.S. Navy for the Coyote Block 3 to provide an ISR and strike capability when launched from unmanned surface vehicles (USVs) and unmanned underwater vehicles (UUVs). Raytheon announced in August 2021 that a demonstration of the Block 3 in an air intercept test had used a non-kinetic warhead to defeat a swarm of 10 drones. This type of payload reduces potential collateral damage and enables the variant to be recovered and reused. The Block 3 Coyote has a more traditional UAV design with wings and an electric motor similar to the original Coyote Block 1, but is bigger in size.

Operational history
The Coyote is launched from a NOAA P-3 Hurricane Hunter aircraft, and provides NOAA hurricane forecasters with real-time data on atmospheric air pressure, temperature, moisture, wind speed and direction as well as surface temperature. The Coyote collects this essential data at altitudes too low for manned aircraft to safely navigate in the hurricane environment. Its first operational deployment was an investigation of  Hurricane Edouard on 16 September 2014.

Specifications

 Airspeed:  cruise,  kts dash
 Deployment altitude: up to  MSL (in non-icing conditions)
 Comms range:  (May 2016);  (ground test October 2016)
 Endurance: 1 hr+ @ cruise (May 2016); 2h (2017)
 Weight:  
 Length: 
 Wingspan:

References

External links

 Raytheon Coyote UAS webpage

Raytheon Company products
Unmanned aerial vehicles of the United States
Counter unmanned air system